The 1963 Auburn Tigers football team represented Auburn University in the 1963 NCAA University Division football season. It was the Tigers' 72nd overall and 30th season as a member of the Southeastern Conference (SEC). The team was led by head coach Ralph "Shug" Jordan, in his 13th year, and played their home games at Cliff Hare Stadium in Auburn, Alabama. They finished with a record of nine wins and two losses (9–2 overall, 6–1 in the SEC).

Schedule

Source: 1963 Auburn football schedule

Roster
QB Jimmy Sidle

References

Auburn
Auburn Tigers football seasons
Auburn Tigers football